Pedicularis lanceolata, the swamp lousewort, is a species of flowering plant native to the Midwestern and Northeastern United States and southern Canada. It is most often found in base-rich wetlands such as fens, springs, and wet meadows.

It produces a spiral of cream-colored flowers in late summer through fall.

References

lanceolata
Flora of Canada
Flora of the Eastern United States
Flora of the United States
Taxa named by André Michaux